Mogetemin (Mogotemin) may be:
Mai Brat language or Ayamaru language, spoken by the Ayamaru people in the many villages around the Ayamaru Lakes on the Bird's Head Peninsula of West Papua
Konda language (Papuan) or Ogit, Yabin, the westernmost mainland Trans–New Guinea language